Mike Johannes Hendrikus Josephus van Beijnen (born 7 March 1999) is a Dutch professional footballer who plays as a right-back for Fortuna Sittard.

Career

Youth career
Born in Breda, van Beijnen played youth football for SAB, The Gunners, RBC, Willem II, PSV, and NAC Breda, before moving to Spanish club Barcelona B in June 2019, signing a two-year contract with a €100 million release clause. Van Beijnen, being the stepson of Frenkie de Jong's agent, Ali Dursun, became part of the massive deal that sent De Jong to Barcelona as a gesture from to club towards Dursun.

Gençlerbirliği
He moved to Turkish club Gençlerbirliği in January 2020, six months after arriving in Barcelona and without making any appearances for the Catalan side. He made his professional debut on 19 July 2020, appearing as a substitute in the Süper Lig.

Fortuna Sittard
In August 2020 he returned to the Netherlands, signing for Fortuna Sittard. He made his debut for the club – which was also his debut in the Eredivisie – on 5 December 2020 in a 3–2 win over Willem II, coming on as a substitute in the 72nd minute for Emil Hansson. In August 2021 he moved on loan to FC Den Bosch.

References

1999 births
Living people
Footballers from Breda
Dutch footballers
RBC Roosendaal players
PSV Eindhoven players
Willem II (football club) players
NAC Breda players
FC Barcelona Atlètic players
Gençlerbirliği S.K. footballers
Fortuna Sittard players
FC Den Bosch players
Süper Lig players
Eredivisie players
Eerste Divisie players
Association football fullbacks
Dutch expatriate footballers
Dutch expatriate sportspeople in Spain
Expatriate footballers in Spain
Dutch expatriate sportspeople in Turkey
Expatriate footballers in Turkey